Sticker art (also known as sticker bombing, sticker slapping, slap tagging, and sticker tagging) is a form of street art in which an image or message is publicly displayed using stickers. These stickers may promote a political agenda, comment on a policy or issue, or comprise a subcategory of graffiti.

Sticker artists use a variety of label types, including inexpensively purchased and free stickers, such as the United States Postal Service's Label 228 or name tags.

History

Even if there were various unknown pioneers before, the first officially recognized example of sticker art in the USA is André the giant has a posse by Shepard Fairey, created in 1989. The first European (and non-American) sticker art project is I Sauri, started in 1993.
Since 2000, many graffiti artists and street artists, like Katsu or Barry McGee incorporated stickers in their production, using them as an alternative to tagging and bombing, or as autonomous art projects.

Creation

Label 228s are often used with hand-drawn art, and are quite hard to remove, leaving a white, sticky residue.

Sticker artists can design and print thousands of stickers at low cost using a commercial printing service or at home with a computer printer and self-adhesive labels.

Sticker artists also print their designs onto adhesive vinyl, which has a strong, permanent adhesive, is waterproof, and generally fade resistant. A variant type of adhesive vinyl, called "destructible", is used by some artists. Destructible vinyl decals are primarily used as tamper indicators on equipment and shipping containers. The difficult–to–remove nature of this material is attractive to sticker artists, including B.N.E. and Obey Giant.

Artists
Artist Cristina Vanko refers to her "I am Coal" project as "smart vandalism." Vanko uses stickers to identify objects that are coal powered, spreading awareness of global climate change.

The artist Cindy Hinant created a series of projects from 2006 to 2009 that combined the tradition of sticker collecting   and sticker bombing in works that reflected on feminine representations in popular culture.

Sticker artists often trade their work with each other in order to expand distribution. An artist's stickers may be distributed worldwide and end up adhered in places they themselves have never been to. These trades are sometimes arranged personally or through social networking sites.

Gallery

See also
 Culture jamming
 Flyposting
 Graffiti
 Guerilla art
 Papier-mâché
 Stencil street art
 Street art
 Street installation
 Street poster art
 Street art sculptures
 Wheatpaste

References

Further reading
 IZASTIKUP:A Unique Collection of Stickers Compiled by Bo130, Microbo and The Don. Drago Media (2005) 
 Claudia Walde (MadC): Sticker City. The Paper Graffiti Generation (Street Graphics / Street Art). Thames & Hudson, 2007. 
 PEEL: The Art of the Sticker by Dave & Holly Combs. Mark Batty Publisher (2008). 
 Stickers: Stick Em' Up by Mike Dorrian & David Recchia. Thames & Hudson (2002). 
 Skateboard Stickers by Mark Munson & Steve Cardwell. Laurence King Publishing (2004). 
 Name Tagging by Martha Cooper. Mark Batty Publisher (2010). 

Visual arts media
Graffiti and unauthorised signage
Art
Articles containing video clips